Brake (Unterweser) is a railway station located in Brake, Germany. The station is located on the Hude-Blexen railway. The train services are operated by NordWestBahn. The station has been part of the Bremen S-Bahn since December 2010.

Train services
The following services currently call at the station:

Bremen S-Bahn services  Nordenham - Hude - Delmenhorst - Bremen

References

External links 
 

Railway stations in Lower Saxony
Bremen S-Bahn